Matthew Kevin Gannon (August 11, 1954 – December 21, 1988) was a CIA officer who was killed in the bombing of Pan Am Flight 103 over Lockerbie, Scotland in 1988.

Gannon was an Arabist who spent much of his career serving in the Middle East. He married Susan Twetten, daughter of Thomas Twetten (later Deputy Director of Operations at CIA). Matthew and Susan met while her father was Matthew's immediate supervisor.

He is buried at Arlington National Cemetery and honored with a star on the CIA Memorial Wall.

In 2001, Abdelbaset al-Megrahi was convicted of 270 counts of murder in connection with the bombing and was sentenced to life imprisonment; his co-accused, Lamin Khalifah Fhimah, was acquitted.

In May 2012, the CIA officially confirmed that Gannon was a CIA officer.

Diplomatic postings 
 Yemen 1979
 Jordan 1981
 Syria 1984-1987
 Lebanon 1988

Bibliography 
 Bainerman, J. The Crimes of a President. 1992 (205-6)
 Chasey, W. Pan Am 103: The Lockerbie Cover Up. 1995 (350)
 Covert Action Information Bulletin 1990-#34 (42)
 Geheim Magazine (Germany) 1988-#9 (33)
 Goddard, D. Coleman,L. Trail of the Octopus. 1993 (83, 85, 143)
 Gup, T. The Book of Honor. 2000 (311)
 Intelligence Newsletter (Paris) 1989-03-29 (1)
 Intelligence Newsletter (Paris) 1989-07-19 (5)
 Nair, K. Devil and His Dart. 1986 (119)
 Perry, M. Eclipse. 1992 (161-4, 167-70, 176-7)
 Thomas, K. Keith,J. The Octopus. 1996 (93)
 Time 1992-04-27 (31)
 Washington Times 1988-12-26 (A8)
 West, N. Games of Intelligence. 1990 (12)

References

External links
Remembering CIA's Heroes: Matthew Kevin Gannon
Biographical information

1954 births
1988 deaths
Murdered CIA agents
People of the Central Intelligence Agency
Pan Am Flight 103 victims
Burials at Arlington National Cemetery
American people murdered abroad
American terrorism victims
People murdered in Scotland
Deaths by improvised explosive device in the United Kingdom
1988 murders in the United Kingdom